Longwangtang Cherry Blossom Park is a park in Longwangtang Subdistrict, Lüshunkou District, Dalian, Liaoning Province, China.

The cherry trees, planted downstream from the dam built by the occupying Japanese in 1921, come into full bloom in late April. It is one of the two most famous cherry blossom parks in China, the other being East Lake Cherry Blossom Park in Wuhan, Hubei.

See also
 Lüshun South Road
 Cherry blossoms in China

Dalian
Cherry blossom